The 1979 Seattle Mariners season was the franchise's third since its creation. The Mariners hosted the All-Star Game on Tuesday, July 17.

Offseason 
 December 5, 1978: Enrique Romo, Rick Jones, and Tom McMillan were traded by the Mariners to the Pittsburgh Pirates for Odell Jones, Rafael Vásquez, and Mario Mendoza.
 December 8, 1978: Craig Reynolds was traded by the Mariners to the Houston Astros for Floyd Bannister.
 December 21, 1978: Mario Díaz was signed as an amateur free agent by the Mariners.
 January 27, 1979: Willie Horton was signed as a free agent by the Mariners.
 February 8, 1979: Jim Todd was released by the Mariners.
 February 22, 1979: Mike Davey was purchased by the Mariners from the Atlanta Braves.

Regular season

Season standings

Record vs. opponents

Opening Day lineup 
 Julio Cruz, 2B
 Bill Stein, 3B
 Dan Meyer, 1B
 Leon Roberts, RF
 Willie Horton, DH
 Ruppert Jones, CF
 Tom Paciorek, LF
 Larry Cox, C
 Mario Mendoza, SS

 Glenn Abbott, starting pitcher

Notable transactions 
 April 10, 1979: Bobby Valentine signed as a free agent by the Mariners.
 June 5, 1979: 1979 Major League Baseball Draft
Mike Hart was drafted by the Mariners in the 13th round.
Bud Black was drafted by the Mariners in the 17th round.
Tom Henke was drafted by the Mariners in the 20th round, but did not sign.
 June 7, 1979: Paul Mitchell was traded by the Mariners to the Milwaukee Brewers for Randy Stein.
 July 6, 1979: Juan Bernhardt was traded by the Mariners to the Chicago White Sox for Rich Hinton.

All-Star Game 
The 1979 Major League Baseball All-Star Game was the 50th playing of the midsummer classic between the all-stars of the American League (AL) and National League (NL), the two leagues comprising Major League Baseball. The game was held on July 17, 1979, at the Kingdome, the home of the Mariners. The National League defeated the American League, 7–6.

Roster

Player stats

Batting

Starters by position 
Note: Pos = Position; G = Games played; AB = At bats; H = Hits; Avg. = Batting average; HR = Home runs; RBI = Runs batted in

Other batters 
Note: G = Games played; AB = At bats; H = Hits; Avg. = Batting average; HR = Home runs; RBI = Runs batted in

Pitching

Starting pitchers 
Note: G = Games pitched; IP = Innings pitched; W = Wins; L = Losses; ERA = Earned run average; SO = Strikeouts

Other pitchers 
Note: G = Games pitched; IP = Innings pitched; W = Wins; L = Losses; ERA = Earned run average; SO = Strikeouts

Relief pitchers 
Note: G = Games pitched; W = Wins; L = Losses; SV = Saves; ERA = Earned run average; SO = Strikeouts

Awards and honors

All-Stars 
1979 Major League Baseball All-Star Game
 Bruce Bochte, reserve

Farm system

LEAGUE CHAMPIONS: San Jose

Notes

References 
1979 Seattle Mariners at Baseball Reference
1979 Seattle Mariners team page at www.baseball-almanac.com

Seattle Mariners seasons
Seattle Mariners season
Seattle Mariners